Bleep and Booster is a children's cartoon series by William Timym (pronounced Tim) originally shown on the BBC's Blue Peter. A total of 44 five-minute episodes comprising 10 separate stories were produced for television between 3 February 1964 and 6 November 1969; the stories then continued in the yearly Blue Peter Books, ending with the Fourteenth Book in 1977

Bleep is an alien from the planet Miron/Myron with a spaceship, whilst Booster is a young human who travels with Bleep performing galactic missions for Bleep's moustached father.

The planet Miron/Myron is portrayed as being built almost entirely out of chrome, with its capital at Miron/Myron City. The inhabitants are portrayed as robot-like creatures with flexible arms and legs like rubber hoses. Their feet are cupped and they have antennae and a third eye in the centre of their foreheads.

Two episodes of the series, The Giant Brain and Solaron were released in 1993 on VHS in the UK by PolyGram Video. No other episodes have been released since then.

The cartoons were animatic animation: still pictures which were slowly panned, with narration. The voices were by Peter Hawkins.

TV stories

 Story 1 (1964-02-03 – 1964-03-16) – 4 episodes
 Story 2 (1964-09-14 – 1964-10-01) – 4 episodes
 Story 3 – Bleep and Booster on Sirius (1964-12-31 – 1965-01-11), 4 episodes 
 Story 4 – Bleep and Booster on Pegasus (1965-03-29 – 1965-04-08), 4 episodes
 Story 5 – Bleep and Booster on Numa (1965-10-04 – 1965-10-14), 4 episodes
 Story 6 – Bleep and Booster on Miron One (1966-04-18 – 1966-04-28), 4 episodes
 Story 7 – Bleep and Booster on E.W.C.O.S 9 (1966-11-21 – 1966-12-01), 4 episodes
 Story 8 – (1967-10-19 – 1967-11-02), 5 episodes
 Story 9 – (1968-10-14 – 1968-10-31), 6 episodes
 Story 10 – The Giant Brain (1969-10-23 – 1969-11-06), 5 episodes

References

External links
 Bleep and Booster on BBC's "My Science Fiction Life" pages
 Bleep and Booster page on Toonhound

BBC children's television shows
1960s British children's television series
1970s British children's television series
Blue Peter
1963 British television series debuts
1977 British television series endings
Animated television series about extraterrestrial life
British children's animated space adventure television series
English-language television shows
1960s British animated television series
1970s British animated television series